Baldur Sigurðsson (born 24 April 1985) is an Icelandic footballer who plays for ÍF Völsungur.

Club career
He has played for Norwegian Adeccoligaen club Bryne and Icelandic clubs Völsungur and Keflavík. He has been capped three times for the Icelandic national team.

On 15 November 2015 it was confirmed, that Baldur had signed a 3-year contract with Stjarnan, and would transfer at the end of the year.

References

External links

1985 births
Living people
Baldur Sigurdsson
Association football midfielders
Baldur Sigurdsson
Baldur Sigurdsson
Baldur Sigurdsson
Baldur Sigurdsson
Bryne FK players
Baldur Sigurdsson
SønderjyskE Fodbold players
Baldur Sigurdsson
Baldur Sigurdsson
Baldur Sigurdsson
Baldur Sigurdsson
Danish Superliga players
Baldur Sigurdsson
Expatriate footballers in Norway
Icelandic expatriate sportspeople in Norway
Expatriate men's footballers in Denmark
Icelandic expatriate sportspeople in Denmark